Lynette Zoe McLean ( – 6 May 2017) was an international lawn bowler from New Zealand.

Biography
She was educated at Freyberg High School and started bowling in 1975 at Northern Bowling Club.

She won two medals at the Asia Pacific Bowls Championships including a gold medal in the 1989 fours, in Suva, Fiji.

She won a silver medal in the women's fours with Adrienne Lambert, Marlene Castle and Rhoda Ryan at the 1990 Commonwealth Games in Auckland.

She died at her home in Foxton Beach on 6 May 2017, aged 72, following a heart attack.

References

1940s births
2017 deaths
New Zealand female bowls players
Commonwealth Games silver medallists for New Zealand
Commonwealth Games medallists in lawn bowls
Bowls players at the 1990 Commonwealth Games
Medallists at the 1990 Commonwealth Games